There are 20 state forests in the Commonwealth of Pennsylvania in the United States.  These forests are managed by the Pennsylvania Bureau of Forestry, which is a division of the Pennsylvania Department of Conservation and Natural Resources. 

A reorganization effective July 1, 2005, shifted territory among several state forests in eastern Pennsylvania, resulting in the elimination of Wyoming State Forest and the creation of Loyalsock State Forest. As of June 2018, Ellen Shultzabarger is the State Forester of Pennsylvania.

List of Pennsylvania state forests

Former State Forests

Former Names of State Forests

See also
 List of U.S. National Forests
 List of Pennsylvania state agencies
 List of Pennsylvania state forest wild areas

External links
PA Bureau of Forestry homepage
Index of PA State Forests

Pennsylvania